There are a number of ways to categorize domes:

By size 
 List of largest domes
 List of tallest domes

By location or origin 
 List of domes in France
 List of Roman domes
 List of Ottoman domes